Patrick Holen Diaiké (born 25 May 1980) is a footballer who has played for the New Caledonia national team.

References

External links

1980 births
Living people
New Caledonian footballers
New Caledonia international footballers
Place of birth missing (living people)
Association football midfielders
2008 OFC Nations Cup players